Varto Terian (May 11, 1896 – October 2, 1974) also known by the pseudonym LaLa, was an Iranian-born Armenian actress and educator. She was Iran’s first stage actress of theater.

Early life and education 
Varto Terian was born on May 11, 1896 in Tabriz, Qajar Iran to an Armenian family. When she was a child her family moved to Tehran. 

After high school she moved to Switzerland to continue her studies at the University of Geneva, where she focused on acting. When she returned to Iran, many theater groups had recently been formed including the Young Armenians Theater Society in Tehran. She met her future husband Arto Terian (1892–1954) at the theater society, he later became a successful actor and theater director.

Career 
After their marriage, in 1914 she launched her theater career. In Iran during the 1910s–1920s women were banned from theater acting and attendance. In order to protect their family she performed under the name LaLa, and Arto used the name Arizad. The couple were the main members of the Armenian Theater of Tehran from 1923 to 1932. Later the couple joined the Young Iran Society, founded by Abdolhossein Teymourtash. 

Terian was also a professor of French language and literature at the Teachers College Tehran. Her daughter was astronomer and physicist, Alenush Terian.

See also 

 Qamar-ol-Moluk Vaziri
 Women's rights movement in Iran

References 

1896 births
1974 deaths
Iranian stage actresses
University of Geneva alumni
People from Tabriz
20th-century Iranian actresses
20th-century Iranian educators
Armenian stage actresses
Iranian people of Armenian descent
People of Pahlavi Iran